Çerkes Mehmed Ali Pasha (died 28 January 1625) was an Ottoman statesman who served as Grand Vizier of the Ottoman Empire from 1624 to 1625.

Mehmed was of Circassian origins, hence his epithet. He was educated in the Enderun School in Istanbul. At one point, he served as the armorer and bodyguard of the sultan. He died of illness on 28 January 1625 in Tokat.

See also
 List of Ottoman Grand Viziers

References

17th-century Grand Viziers of the Ottoman Empire
People from the Ottoman Empire of Circassian descent
1625 deaths
Year of birth unknown